River Bottom may refer to:

 River Bottom (album) by Country Gentlemen, 1980
 River Bottom, Oklahoma, United States
 River Phoenix (1970–1993), American actor, musician and activist
 "River Bottom", by Country Gentlemen from River Bottom (album), 1980

See also
 At the Bottom of the River, a 1983 short story collection by Jamaica Kincaid
 "Bottom of the River", by Delta Rae from Carry the Fire, 2012
 "Riverbottom", by Texas Hippie Coalition from Pride of Texas, 2008